WASP-29 is a binary star system in the constellation of Phoenix. The primary star is an orange main sequence star. Its comoving companion, a red dwarf star, was discovered in 2021. The star system kinematically belongs to the thin disk of the Milky Way.

Star characteristics 
Primary is an old star with small starspot activity and low x-ray flux.

Planetary system 
The "Hot Saturn" class planet WASP-29b was discovered around WASP-29 in 2010. The planet would have an equilibrium temperature of 960 K. The planetary atmosphere has abundant carbon monoxide but likely lacks methane and sodium, although high and dense cloud deck of WASP-29 b prevent the high-quality spectroscopic measurements.
A study in 2018 revealed the stability of planetary orbits in the habitable zone of WASP-29 is significantly affected by the WASP-29b planet.

References 

Planetary systems with one confirmed planet
Phoenix (constellation)
Binary stars
K-type main-sequence stars
M-type main-sequence stars
Planetary transit variables
J23513108-3954241
29
Durchmusterung objects